is a Japanese footballer currently playing as a defensive midfielder or a centre back for Urawa Red Diamonds.

Career statistics

Club
.

Notes

Honours

Club
Urawa Red Diamonds
Emperor's Cup: 2021
Japanese Super Cup: 2022

References

External links

1998 births
Living people
Ryutsu Keizai University alumni
Japanese footballers
Association football midfielders
J1 League players
Urawa Red Diamonds players